Marsha Milan Londoh (born December 6, 1985) is a Malaysian singer and actress. She gained fame for being a contestant in the third season of the Malaysian reality show contest Akademi Fantasia, in which she won the fourth place.

In 2013, Marsha dubbed the voice of Elsa in the Malaysian dub of Disney's Frozen and sang the title track Bebaskan (Malay version of "Let It Go"), the second Disney film dubbed in Bahasa Malaysia for cinema release after Tarzan (1999).

Personal life
Marsha is a Kadazan-dusun from Tamparuli, Sabah. Linda Nanuwil, who was the first runner-up of season 2 of Akademi Fantasia, is her cousin.

Marsha was a Christian and was raised with Christian values and beliefs before converting to Islam in December 2015 due to marriage laws in Malaysia.

Reality television

Akademi Fantasia

Marsha was one of the competitors in Akademi Fantasia Season 3. During the Prelude concert, Marsha failed to perform as she was diagnosed with sore throat. Panel of jury was in consensus that her failure to participate in the concert engendered her to be automatically disqualified. Nevertheless, she was called back to perform again in AF3 first week concert, and she welcome sign in academy with Mawi through AF SERAP.

AF Megastar 2017
In 2017, Marsha joined the first reboot of Akademi Fantasia, dubbed AF Megastar. AF Megastar is a singing competition for Akademi Fantasia alumni. Despite not winning the competition, Marsha advanced to the grand finals and won a subsidiary award, Anugerah Terlajak Megastar with a prize money of RM 10,000.

Discography

Extended Play

Singles

Filmography

Film

Telemovies
2005 – Rumah Terbuka AF3
2005 – Gitu-gitu Raya
2008 – Besan vs Madu
2008 – 5 saat
2009 – Beautiful Maria
2009 – Cinta Meriam Buluh
2009 – Marah-marah Sayang
2009 – Pun Pun
2010 – Takdir
2010 – Kum Kum
2011 – Ekspres Dania
2011 – Hantu Susu
2017 – Terobek Raya

TV series
2006 – Kirana
2008 – Mega Sekeping Hati
2009 – Korban 44
2010 – Hotel Mania
2010 – K.I.T.A
2010 – Dottie
2010 – Salon
2010 – Awan Dania 3
2010 – Seribu Kali Cinta
2011 – Asmara 2
2011 – Kum Kum the series
2011 – Dunia Kita
2011 – 24 hari sebelum mencari cinta
2012 – Bicara hati
2012 – Mihrab Cinta
2012 – Berita Hangit
2013 – Duri Di Hati
2013 – Benci VS Cinta
2015 – Keluarga Pontimau
2017 – Oh My Pondok (sitcom)
2017 – 3 Dara Kg.Com
2018 - Bimbi & Bonni Misi 007
2021 – Rindu Awak Separuh Nyawa - Nurul Huda
2022 – Sepahtu Reunion Live
2022 – The Maid 2

Webseries
2007 – Kerana Karina 1
2008 – Kerana Karina 2
2008 – Kerana Karina 3

Television hosting
 Mentor Millenia 2016 (TV3)
 Mentor Millenia 2017 (TV3)
 Teroka Lokal (2020) (Naura HD)

Awards and nominations

References

External links
 
 
 
 

1985 births
Living people
Kadazan-Dusun people
Malaysian Muslims
Converts to Islam from Christianity
Malaysian former Christians
21st-century Malaysian women singers
Malaysian television personalities
People from Sabah
Malay-language singers
People from Berrien County, Michigan
Akademi Fantasia participants